The Songwriters Guild of America (SGA) is an organization founded in 1931, to help "advance, promote, and benefit" the profession of songwriters.  It was founded as the Songwriters Protective Association by Billy Rose, George W. Meyer and Edgar Leslie.  SGA issued the first standard songwriters contract in 1932 and most writers consider it the 'standard' agreement in the industry.  in 1982, SGA moved its executive office from New York City to Nashville.  As of February 2012, the Songwriters Guild of America, Inc., has been operating as a Tennessee corporation.  Since 1973, The Songwriters Guild Foundation has been organized as a New York corporation.

In 1976, the organization, along with the RIAA, was one of the driving forces behind the creation of the Copyright Act of 1976. In July 1999, a similar but much smaller organization — National Academy of Songwriters based on Los Angeles — closed and recommended that its 3,000 members join the Songwriters Guild of America.  NAS's impetus for closing was a concession of unnecessary redundancies of the two organizations striving for the same goal.

Rick Carnes has been the president for the last  years.

The Songwriters Guild features online and offline classes in songwriting and the music business. Other features include contract review for members, in-depth song evaluations, royalty collection services and music industry resources.

History 
The Songwriters Protective Association was formed in 1931 partly as a counterweight to the Music Publishers Protective Association, which was founded in 1917.  It gave creative talent some institutional heft in dealings with increasingly corportized publishers, producers, record companies, and studios.

Name changes 
In May 1958, the organization changed its name from Songwriters Protective Association to the American Guild of Authors and Composers (AGAC).  In the 1980s, the organization changed its name to Songwriters Guild of America.

Presidents & executive directors

Presidents
 1931–19??: Billy Rose
 1936–1942: Irving Caesar
 1942–1951: Sigmund Romberg
 1952–1955: Charles Tobias
 1955–1957: Abel Baer (1893–1976)
 1957–1966: Burton Lane
 1968–1972: Edward Eliscu
 1973–1982: Ervin Drake
 1982–2000: George David Weiss
 2002–current: Rick Carnes (née Charles Frederick Carnes; born 1950)

Executive directors
 Miriam Rose Stern (1912–1990)
 (19??–2005): Lewis Bachman (1934–2006)
 (2005–2008): Rundi Ann Ream (born 1962)

See also 

 National Academy of Songwriters
 National Academy of Popular Music
 Songwriters Hall of Fame

References

External links
 Official website
 Songwriter's Guide
 Informational video about Songwriters Guild of America

Organizations established in 1931
Music organizations based in the United States